Siltʼe (ስልጥኘ  or የስልጤ አፍ ) is an Ethiopian Semitic language  spoken in central Ethiopia. A member of the Afroasiatic family, its speakers are the Siltʼe, who mainly inhabit the Siltʼe Zone in the Southern Nations, Nationalities, and Peoples' Region. Speakers of the Wolane dialect mainly inhabit the Kokir Gedebano district of Gurage Zone, as well as the neighbouring Seden Sodo district of the Oromia Region. Some have also settled in urban areas in other parts of the country, especially Addis Ababa.

Speakers and dialects

Dialects of the Siltʼe language include: Azernet-Berbere, Silti, Wuriro, Ulbareg and Wolane. There are about 940,000 native Siltʼe speakers (2007 census); 125,000 speakers of Wolane.

Phonology

Consonants
Siltʼe has a fairly typical set of consonants for an Ethiopian Semitic language.

The charts below show the phonemes of Siltʼe. For the representation of Siltʼe consonants, this article uses a modification of a system that is common (though not universal), among linguists who work on Ethiopian Semitic languages, but differs somewhat from the conventions of the International Phonetic Alphabet. When the IPA symbol is different, it is indicated in brackets in the charts.

{| class="wikitable"  style="text-align:center"
|+ Consonants
|-
!colspan="2"|
!Labial
!Dental/Alveolar
!Postalveolar/Palatal
!Velar
!Glottal
|-
!rowspan="3"|Plosive/Affricate
!Voiceless
|
|
| 
|
|
|-
!Voiced
|
|
| 
|
|
|-
!Ejective
|
|
| 
|
|
|-
!rowspan="2"|Fricatives
!Voiceless
|
|
| 
|
|
|-
!Voiced
|
|
| 
|
|
|-
!colspan="2"|Nasals
|
|
| 
|
|
|-
!colspan="2"|Approximants
|
|
| 
|
|
|-
!colspan="2"|Flap/Trill
|
|
|
|
|
|}

Vowels
Siltʼe vowels differ considerably from the typical set of seven vowels in languages such as Amharic, Tigrinya and Geʽez. Siltʼe has the set of five short and five long vowels that are typical of the nearby Eastern Cushitic languages, which may be the origin of the Siltʼe system. All of the short vowels may be devoiced preceding a pause.

{| class="wikitable" style="text-align:center"
|+Vowels
|-
!
!Front
!Central
!Back
|-
!High
|i, ii
|
|u, uu
|-
!Mid
|e, ee
| 
|o, oo
|-
!Low
|
|aa
|
|}

Orthography
Since at least the 1980s, Siltʼe has been written in the Geʽez script, originally developed for the now-extinct Geʽez language and most familiar today in its use for Amharic and Tigrinya.

This orthographic system makes distinctions among only seven vowels. Some of the short-long distinctions in Siltʼe are therefore not marked. In practice, this probably does not interfere with comprehension because there are relatively few minimal pairs based on vowel length.
In written Siltʼe, the seven Geʽez vowels are mapped onto the ten Siltʼe vowels as follows:
 ä → a: አለፈ alafa 'he passed'
 u → u, uu: ሙት mut 'death', muut 'thing'
 i →
 ii: ኢን iin 'eye'
 word-final i: መሪ mari 'friend'
 i ending a noun stem: መሪከ marika 'his friend'
 impersonal perfect verb i suffix: ባሊ baali 'people said'; በባሊም babaalim 'even if people said'
 a → aa: ጋራሽ gaaraaš 'your (f.) house'
 e → e, ee: ኤፌ eeffe 'he covered'
 ǝ →
 i (except as above): እንግር ingir 'foot'
 consonant not followed by a vowel: አስሮሽት asroošt 'twelve'
 o → o, oo: ቆጬ kʼočʼe 'tortoise', kʼoočʼe 'he cut'

Language vitality
Meshesha Make Jobo reports that the use of the Siltʼe language is being replaced by the use of Amharic by some speakers for some domains. He points to large political and social factors, many from the national level. He also points out smaller, local factors, such as the lack of creative genres.

References

Bibliography
Dirk Bustorf 2011: Lebendige Überlieferung: Geschichte und Erinnerung der muslimischen Siltʼe Äthiopiens. With an English Summary. Wiesbaden: Harrassowitz (Aethiopistische Forschungen 74).
Cohen, Marcel (1931). Études d'éthiopien méridional. Société Asiatique, Collection d'ouvrages orientaux. Paris: Geuthner.
Drewes, A.J. (1997). "The story of Joseph in Sïltʼi Gurage", in: Grover Hudson (ed.), Essays on Gurage language and culture: dedicated to Wolf Leslau on the occasion of his 90th birthday, November 14, 1996, Wiesbaden: Harrassowitz, pp. 69–92.
Gutt, E.H.M. & Hussein Mohammed (1997). Siltʼe–Amharic–English dictionary (with a concise grammar by E-A Gutt). Addis Ababa: Addis Ababa University Press.
Gutt, E.-A. (1983). Studies in the phonology of Silti. Journal of Ethiopian Studies 16, pp. 37–73.
Gutt, E.-A. (1991). "Aspects of number in Siltʼi grammar", in: Proceedings of the 11th International Conference of Ethiopian Studies (Addis Ababa), pp. 453–464.
Gutt, E.-A. (1997). "Concise grammar of Siltʼe", in: Gutt, E.H.M. 1997, pp. 895–960.
Leslau, W. (1979). Etymological Dictionary of Gurage (Ethiopic). 3 vols. Wiesbaden: Otto Harrassowitz. 
Wagner, Ewald (1983). "Seltʼi-verse in arabischer Schrift aus dem Schlobies-Nachlass", in: Stanislav Segert & András J.E. Bodrogligeti (eds.), Ethiopian studies dedicated to Wolf Leslau, Wiesbaden: Harrassowitz, pp. 363–374.

External links
Silte Music Live
https://web.archive.org/web/20071008150243/http://www.siltie.com/
Webaja Silte Discussion Forum

Transverse Ethiopian Semitic languages
Languages of Ethiopia